No Frills Friend is Amy Allison's third solo album. It was released on July 1, 2003 on Diesel Only Records. It was recorded in Scotland and produced by David Scott of the Pearlfishers.

Critical reception

No Frills Friend was described by Mark Keresman of SF Weekly as "a gem of despondent, shimmering pop/folk/rock balladry". Keresman also wrote that it "retains her distinctively mournful, somewhat nasal warble and her gift for simple yet sturdy melodies" found on her previous albums. Neil Jones of Drowned in Sound described No Frills Friend as "a vocally driven record dripping with melodic richness."

Track listing
What's the Deal?
No Frills Friend
Baby, You're the One
Hell to Pay
Pretty Things to Buy
Don't String Me Along
Say It Isn't So
Dreaming's Killing Me
Thank God for the Wine
Beautiful Night
Completely Yours
Hanging on a Moment
Moonlight on the Mountains

Personnel
Amy Allison—Composer, Guitar (Acoustic), Primary Artist, Vocals
Irving Berlin—Composer
Gina R. Binkley—Design
Avy Carroli—Sleigh Bells
Jim Gash—Drums, Percussion
Paul McGeechan—Mastering
Bonnie Raitt—Composer
David Scott—Bass, Engineer, Guitar, Keyboards, Primary Artist, Producer, Vocals
Derek Star—Percussion

References

Amy Allison albums
Diesel Only Records albums
2003 albums